Lovers Under the Rain is a 1986 Taiwanese television drama series based on Chiung Yao's 1964 romance novel Fire and Rain. Mainly set in 1960s Taipei, the story follows a young girl Lu Yi-ping as she plotted revenge against her father—formerly a warlord in Northeast China who had 9 wives before fleeing the Chinese Communist Revolution for Taiwan—and his entire household, including her kind half-sister Lu Ru-ping.

The second Chiung Yao adaptation starring Leanne Liu and Chin Han after the highly successful How Many Red Sunsets (1985), this drama proved even a bigger hit, capturing over 42% of the Taiwanese audiences.

Cast
Leanne Liu as Lu Yi-ping
Tsai Tsan-te as Lu Yi-ping (young)
Chin Han as Ho Shu-huan
Chao Yung- as Lu Ru-ping
Tsou Lin-lin as Lu Meng-ping
Lee Tien-chu as Lu Er-hao
Wen Kuo-hua as Lu Er-chieh
Kou Feng as Lu Chen-hua
Yeh Hsiao-yi as Lu Chen-hua (younger)
Tseng Ya-chun as Fu Wen-pei 
Ku Yin as Wang Hsueh-chin
Fan Hung-hsuan as Li Cheng-te
Ma Huei-chen as Yu-chen
Chu Huei-chen as Li Ko-yun
Wen Chieh as Fang Yu
Wen Shuai as Wei Kuang-hsiung
Chang Shun-hsing as Hsu Chao
Fang Wen-lin as Lu Hsin-ping
Wang Li as Ah Lan
Yu Ho-ling as Fu Wen-pei's father
Chang Yu-chin as Fu Wen-pei's mother
Kuo Ping as Fu Wen-pei's aunt

References

1986 Taiwanese television series debuts
1986 Taiwanese television series endings
Television shows based on works by Chiung Yao
Mandarin-language television shows
Television shows set in China
Television shows set in Taiwan
Television shows filmed in Taiwan
Television series set in the 1960s
Chinese Television System original programming
Taiwanese romance television series
1980s romance television series
1980s Taiwanese television series